The 1972–73 1re série season was the 52nd season of the 1re série, the top level of ice hockey in France. Chamonix Hockey Club won their 28th league title.

Final ranking
 1st place: Chamonix Hockey Club
 2nd place: Viry-Châtillon Essonne Hockey
 3rd place: Ours de Villard-de-Lans
 4th place: Sporting Hockey Club Saint Gervais
 5th place: Gap Hockey Club
 6th place: Français Volants
 7th place: CSG Grenoble
 8th place: Club des Sports de Megève
 9th place: Club des patineurs lyonnais
 10th place: CPM Croix

External links
List of French champions on hockeyarchives.info

France
1972–73 in French ice hockey
Ligue Magnus seasons